The International Studies Review is a quarterly peer-reviewed academic journal published by Oxford University Press on behalf of the International Studies Association. Former editors-in-chief include Kelly Kadera (University of Iowa) and Laura Sjoberg (University of Florida). The journal covers research in international studies. It was established in 1957 as Mershon International Studies Review and obtained its current title in 1999, with volume numbering restarting at 1.

According to the Journal Citation Reports, the journal has a 2018 impact factor of 2.076, ranking it 47th out of 176 journals in the category "Political Science" and 19th out of 91 journals in the category "International Relations".

See also 
 List of international relations journals
 List of political science journals

References

External links 
 

Wiley-Blackwell academic journals
English-language journals
Quarterly journals
International relations journals
Publications established in 1957